Longswamp is an unincorporated community in Longswamp Township in Berks County, Pennsylvania, United States. Longswamp is located along State Street southeast of Topton.

History
A post office called Longswamp was established in 1822, and remained in operation until 1906. The community took its name from Longswamp Township.

References

Unincorporated communities in Berks County, Pennsylvania
Unincorporated communities in Pennsylvania